German submarine U-558 was a Type VIIC U-boat in the service of Nazi Germany's Kriegsmarine during World War II. She sank 18 ships totalling 94,099 GRT before being sunk by bombers on 20 July 1943.

Construction and early service life
U-558 was laid down on 6 January 1940 at Blohm & Voss in Hamburg, Germany as yard number 534 and launched on 23 December 1940. She was commissioned on 20 February 1941, with Oberleutnant zur See Günther Krech in command.

Her service began with the 1st U-boat Flotilla where she conducted training before moving on to operations, also with the first flotilla, on 1 May 1941.

Design
German Type VIIC submarines were preceded by the shorter Type VIIB submarines. U-558 had a displacement of  when at the surface and  while submerged. She had two shafts and two  propellers.

U-558 was fitted with five  torpedo tubes (four fitted at the bow and one at the stern), fourteen torpedoes, one  SK C/35 naval gun, 220 rounds, and a  C/30 anti-aircraft gun. The boat had a complement of between forty-four and sixty.

Service history

First, second and third patrols
U-558 departed Kiel on 1 June 1941 and entered the Atlantic via the North Sea and the gap between Iceland and the Faroe Islands with no major encounters, arriving at her new home port of Brest in occupied France on the 28th.

Her second patrol was also relatively uneventful.

She torpedoed and sank the Otaio, a 10,298 GRT cargo ship, on 28 August.

Fourth and fifth patrols
Her fourth patrol, which began on 11 October 1941, first saw action off Ireland when she torpedoed and sank the unescorted Vancouver Island, a Canadian merchant ship of 9,472 GRT, on 15 October. Two days later on 17 October, U-558 was involved in a devastating attack on Convoy SC 48 in the North Atlantic. During the battle, U-558 sank three ships: the 9,552 GRT British merchant steamer W.C. Teagle, and the Norwegian merchant steamers Erviken (which broke in two and sank in three minutes) and Rym, 6,595 and 1,369 GRT respectively U-558 took a hit from a depth charge dropped by a Catalina flying boat, but did not sustain serious damage and continued to shadow the convoy. She returned to Brest on 25 October 1941, having sunk four ships in the 15 days of her fourth patrol.

U-558s fifth patrol began on 24 November 1941. On 2 December, a British aircraft spotted the U-boat attempting to enter the Mediterranean Sea and called for surface support. U-558 took serious damage from depth charges dropped by the two ships that responded. She was able to escape, but had to return to Brest for repairs, arriving 7 December 1941 after only 14 days at sea, having had no success.

Sixth and seventh patrols
U-558 required significant repairs and remained in port until 10 February 1942, when she embarked on her sixth patrol. On 21 February Convoy ONS 67 was spotted, so she moved into position along with five other submarines. Eight of its ships were sunk by the U-boats, another two were left damaged. On 24 February, U-558 torpedoed the 8,009 GRT British tanker Anadara, which escaped. That same day she also torpedoed and sank the 9,432 GRT Norwegian tanker Eidanger and the 5,578 GRT British steamer Inverarder. She returned to Brest on 11 March 1942.

U-558 departed Brest to begin her seventh patrol of the war on 12 April 1942 . Six days later on 18 May, she sank the 1,254 GRT Dutch steamer Fauna. On 21 May she sank the 1,925 GRT Canadian steamer Troisdoc in the Caribbean. Off Jamaica on 23 May, U-558 torpedoed the 7,061 GRT American merchant steamer William Boyce Thompson, but the tanker used evasive maneuvers and reached the safety of Guantanamo Bay, Cuba for repairs. Still in the Caribbean on 25 May, U-558 next attacked the 3,451 GRT American merchant steamer Beatrice. When her torpedo hit the ship but failed to detonate, U-558 surfaced and trained her deck guns on the vessel, which was quickly ordered abandoned, and subsequently sunk. Remaining in the Caribbean, U-558 next torpedoed and sank the 2,622 GRT United States Army transport USAT Jack on 27 May. U-558 returned to Brest to end her seventh patrol on 21 June 1942, having sunk six ships and damaged one.

Eighth, ninth and tenth patrols
U-558s eighth patrol began when she left Brest on 29 July 1942. On 25 August, she encountered the 1,987 GRT British steamer Amakura, which had been travelling with Convoy WAT 15 but had fallen behind. U-558 encountered Convoy TAG 5 on 13 September; she torpedoed and sank the 7,241 GRT British cargo ship Empire Lugard and the 7,915 GRT Dutch steamer Suriname. The same day she also hit the convoy's 6,672 GRT Norwegian tanker Vilja, whose crew quickly abandoned ship but were able to reboard after U-558 left the area. Vilja did not sink, but was later deemed a total loss. U-558 returned to port on 16 October, having sunk four ships and damaged a fifth.

U-558 remained in port until the end of 1942, and embarked on her ninth war patrol on 9 January 1943. In January she met with the U-109 in order to transfer an officer to their crew, since the commander of U-109 had fallen out with a nervoud breakdown. She found no other targets during her ninth patrol, which ended when she returned to Brest on 29 March 1943.

Her tenth—and ultimately last—patrol began on 8 May 1943. U-558 ran into difficulty many times during this patrol. At one point, she manoeuvred to attack a large eastbound convoy, but a destroyer harried her into retreat. Off Lisbon on 14 July, a British Wellington bomber from No. 179 Squadron RAF dropped depth charges; U-558 was not hit, and damaged the plane with anti-aircraft fire. Three days later off Porto on 17 July, a British Liberator from 224 Squadron dropped 24 35-pound anti-submarine bombs, but U-558 was able to escape by crash-diving; the plane took damage from anti-aircraft fire and its own malfunctioning bombs.

Fate
In the Bay of Biscay on 20 July, an American B-24 Liberator from the 19th Antisubmarine Squadron, United States Army Air Forces, called the Sea Hawk dropped depth charges on U-558; the boat was undamaged, and returned fire, shooting down the bomber.

Later the same day, a second Liberator from the 19th Antisubmarine Squadron, 479th Antisubmarine Group, piloted by Charles F. Gallmeier, dropped 7 depth charges on U-558. The sub was severely damaged and unable to dive. The Liberator, her port inner engine taken out by U-558s anti-aircraft flak guns, left the scene and was relieved by a Halifax bomber from 58 Squadron, piloted by Geoffrey R. Sawtell. Although the U-boat was devastated by the previous attack, and the Germans were attempting to scuttle and to abandon the ship, the Halifax attacked U-558 with 8 depth charges. All other 41 men perished.

Wolfpacks
U-558 took part in nine wolfpacks, namely:
 Bosemüller (28 August – 2 September 1941) 
 Seewolf (2 – 12 September 1941) 
 Delphin (24 January – 14 February 1943) 
 Rochen (16 – 28 February 1943) 
 Tümmler (1 – 22 March 1943) 
 Oder (17 – 19 May 1943) 
 Mosel (19 – 24 May 1943) 
 Trutz (1 – 16 June 1943) 
 Trutz 1 (16 – 29 June 1943)

Summary of raiding history

References

Bibliography

External links

German Type VIIC submarines
U-boats commissioned in 1941
U-boats sunk in 1943
World War II submarines of Germany
1940 ships
Ships built in Hamburg
World War II shipwrecks in the Atlantic Ocean
Shipwrecks in the Bay of Biscay
U-boats sunk by British aircraft
U-boats sunk by depth charges
Maritime incidents in July 1943